Whitney Reed (August 20, 1932 – January 9, 2015) was a former U.S. No. 1 tennis player from the United States who was active in the 1950s and 1960s. Reed was ranked No. 1 amateur in the United States in 1961 and was ranked in the U.S. amateur top ten in 1957 (No. 8), 1959 (No. 9), 1960 (No. 8), and 1962 (No. 6).

During his career, he had wins over Rod Laver, Roy Emerson, Neale Fraser, Chuck McKinley, Frank Sedgman, Manuel Santana, Gardnar Mulloy, Art Larsen and Alex Olmedo. All these players are enshrined in the International Tennis Hall of Fame.

He won the 1959 NCAA Intercollegiate singles championship while at San Jose State University. Also that year, he won the singles title and reached the doubles final at the Cincinnati Masters. In 1961 and 1963, he won the singles titles at the Canadian Open Tennis  Championships.

He also was named three times to the United States Davis Cup squad, 1958, 1961 and 1962.

Reed was enlisted in the San Jose State University and USTA Northern California Halls of Fame.

References

External links
 
 
 

American male tennis players
Sportspeople from Oakland, California
San Jose State Spartans men's tennis players
Tennis people from California
1932 births
2015 deaths
American military personnel of the Korean War